S. Hussain Zaidi (born 28 February 1968) is an Indian author and former investigative journalist. His works include Dongri to Dubai: Six Decades of the Mumbai Mafia, Mafia Queens of Mumbai, Black Friday, My Name is Abu Salem and Mumbai Avengers.

S. Hussain Zaidi is India's most prolific crime writer. He publishes under the Blue Salt imprint. The Mumbai mafia has been his focus in books such as Dongri to Dubai: Six Decades of the Mumbai Mafia, Mafia Queens of Mumbai, My Name is Abu Salem and Byculla to Bangkok.

Zaidi began his career in journalism while working for the newspaper The Asian Age, where he became the resident editor. Zaidi later worked for several other periodicals, including The Indian Express, Mid-Day and Mumbai Mirror. His in-depth research on the Mumbai mafia has been used by international authors, including Misha Glenny in McMafia and Vikram Chandra in his book Sacred Games. Zaidi was once kidnapped in Iraq.

Zaidi has covered the Mumbai mafia for several decades. His 2002 book Black Friday detailed the 1993 Mumbai bombings, an attack consisting of thirteen explosions that killed 250 people. The book was adapted two years later, in 2004, into a film by Anurag Kashyap also titled Black Friday. The film was so controversial that the Indian Censor Board did not allow it to be released in India for three years. It was finally released on 9 February 2007 after the Supreme Court of India allowed it following the TADA court verdict in the '93 Bombay blast case. In Dongri to Dubai: Six Decades of the Mumbai Mafia, a historical account of the Mumbai mafia, Zaidi conducted an interview with crime boss Dawood Ibrahim, who is suspected of having orchestrated the bombings. The book was adapted into the film Shootout at Wadala by Sanjay Gupta.

Zaidi was also an associate producer of the HBO documentary Terror in Mumbai, which is based on the 26/11 attacks in Mumbai.

The 2015 Kabir Khan film Phantom, starring Saif Ali Khan and Katrina Kaif, is an adaptation of Zaidi's book Mumbai Avengers; the screenplay was written in conjunction with the author.

Farhan Akhtar and Ritesh Sidhwani of Excel Entertainment are making a web series titled Dongri to Dubai, an adaptation of Zaidi's book. The series will reportedly focus on Dawood Ibrahim's early life, as well as his gang members and other contemporary mob bosses.

Shah Rukh Khan's production house Red Chillies Entertainment released a Netflix film titled Class of '83, starring Bobby Deol and directed by Atul Sabharwal, based on Zaidi's book of the same name.

Gangubai Kathiawadi is an Indian Hindi-language biographical crime film directed by Sanjay Leela Bhansali and produced by Bhansali Productions in conjunction with Jayantilal Gada's Pen India Ltd. The film is based on Zaidi's book Mafia Queens of Mumbai. The story revolves around Gangubai Kothewali, a brothel owner and matriarch.

Matchbox Pictures has acquired the filming rights to journalist Jigna Vora's book Behind Bars in Byculla: My Days in Prison, co-published by Penguin Random House and Blue Salt.

London Confidential: The Chinese Conspiracy is an Indian Hindi-language spy thriller film which has been streaming on ZEE5 since September 2020. Directed by Kanwal Sethi and produced by Mohit Chhabra and Ajay Rai, it was written by Zaidi and stars Mouni Roy and Purab Kohli. the narrative revolves around a conspiracy to spread an infection.

Zaidi did an interview with Spymaster Lucky Bisht in June 2022, Bisht was in many controversies during his job, for which he had to go to jail but later he was acquitted of judiciary.

Publications
 Black Friday: The True Story of the Bombay Bomb Blasts (2002)
 Mafia Queens of Mumbai (2011)
 Dongri to Dubai: Six Decades of the Mumbai Mafia (2012)
 Headley and I (2012)
 Byculla to Bangkok (2014)
 My Name Is Abu Salem (2014)
 Mumbai Avengers (2015)
 Dangerous Minds (2017)
 Eleventh Hour (2018)
 Dawood's Mentor (2019)
 The Class of 83: The Punishers of Mumbai Police (2019)
 The Endgame (2020)
 Zero Day (2022)

Filmography 

 London Confidential: The Chinese Conspiracy (2020)
 Lahore Confidential (2021)
 Black Friday
 Shootout at Wadala
 Phantom
 Class of '83
 Gangubai Kathiawadi
 Dongri To Dubai
 Mumbai Mafia: Police vs The Underworld

References

External links 

 

Living people
Indian investigative journalists
Indian male novelists
Indian male journalists
1968 births
Indian screenwriters
Writers from Mumbai
Screenwriters from Mumbai
21st-century Indian non-fiction writers
21st-century Indian journalists
21st-century Indian screenwriters
Hindi screenwriters
Twelvers
Indian Shia Muslims